Oxymel is a mixture of honey and vinegar, used as a medicine.

Its name is often found in Renaissance (and later) pharmacopoeiae in Late Latin form as either a countable or uncountable noun. As a countable noun, it is spelled variously as (singular) oxymellus and oxymellis, and
plural oxymeli and oxymelli.

Etymology and recipe 

Cato the Elder describes it thus:

 A wine made from vinegar and honey, which in Greece was called oxymel, (hence [Latin] "oxymel"). It is made thus. Ten libras of honey with five heminas of vinegar, which will be subsumed. Themison confused oxymel and hydromel. But hydromel wine is made from water and honey, hence the name. Its name recalls the creation of omphacomel, which is made from semi-dry [i.e. sharp] grapes and sweet honey, hence the name, . Hence what is called  ["omphalic oil"], from sour olives which in Greek is called (?), and omphacium from grapes, commonly called agreste.

Use 

In the 1593 work Enchiridion chirurgicum, oxymel was recommended as part of a treatment for ophthalmia.

Because Latin was (and is) still used widely in medical prescriptions, it was still known by this name in Victorian times:

 Prescription: Lead acetate one grain. Dissolve in rose water, three parts, and add undiluted oxymel, 3 parts, tincture of opium, five parts, tincture of digitalis. To be taken every four to six hours.

See also 
Sekanjabin
Switchel

References 

Greek drinks
Honey
Vinegar